Morike Sako (born 17 November 1981) is a French former professional footballer who played as a forward.

Club career

Early career
Born in Paris, Sako began his career in France with US Ivry, leaving in 2004 to join Swiss side SR Delémont.

Torquay United
Sako joined Torquay United in July 2005, one of three French players, the others being Mamadoli Sow and Carl Priso signed at the same time by then Torquay manager Leroy Rosenior. Sako was the most successful and popular of the three, playing 27 times and scoring three goals the following season, his league debut coming in a 3–0 defeat away to Mansfield Town on 13 August 2005. He was one of six players transfer-listed in October 2005 as Torquay struggled in the league, but regained his place in the side and was taken off the list in January 2006 after Rosenior had been replaced by John Cornforth. Torquay chairman Mike Bateson turned down an offer for Sako on the transfer deadline day at the end of that month. He was surprisingly released by new manager Ian Atkins at the end of the season, despite playing in some crucial games as Torquay successfully fought off relegation to the Conference National.

He had trials with a number of clubs after being released from Torquay, including League One clubs Bristol City and Blackpool.

Rochdale
In August 2006, Sako signed for League Two club Rochdale having impressed manager Steve Parkin.

At the end of December 2006, Sako left Rochdale after being told his contract would not be renewed. He played twenty times for the club, scoring three goals.

He was on then trial at League One club, AFC Bournemouth.

FC St. Pauli
In January 2007, Sako signed a short-term contract until the end of the 2006–07 season to play for German 2. Bundesliga club FC St. Pauli after rejecting an offer from League 2 side Bury. He later signed a contract with St. Pauli until the end of the 2008–09 season. Sako went on to play 71 matches for St. Pauli and to score eight goals. In the 2009–10 season, Sako helped St. Pauli to gain promotion to the Bundesliga.

Arminia Bielefeld
In September 2010, Sako signed a one-year contract with an optional year's extension with 2. Bundesliga side Arminia Bielefeld. He was released after one year, then spent two years without a club before signing for Hessen Kassel.

Personal life
Sako is the older brother of Crystal Palace player Bakary Sako.

References

External links
 

Living people
1981 births
French footballers
Association football midfielders
Association football forwards
Footballers from Paris
French people of Malian descent
2. Bundesliga players
Regionalliga players
US Ivry players
SR Delémont players
Torquay United F.C. players
Rochdale A.F.C. players
FC St. Pauli players
Arminia Bielefeld players
KSV Hessen Kassel players
FC Eintracht Norderstedt 03 players
French expatriate footballers
French expatriate sportspeople in England
Expatriate footballers in England
French expatriate sportspeople in Germany
Expatriate footballers in Germany